Events in the year 1962 in Taiwan, Republic of China. This year is numbered Minguo 51 according to the official Republic of China calendar.

Incumbents 
 President – Chiang Kai-shek
 Vice President – Chen Cheng
 Premier – Chen Cheng
 Vice Premier – Wang Yun-wu

Events

April
 1 April – The upgrade of Sanchong from an urban township to a county-administered city.
 28 April – The establishment of TTV Main Channel.

May
 16 May – The opening of Hualien Airport in Hualien County.

July
 11 July – The establishment of China Maritime Institute.

October
 10 October – The official launch of TTV Main Channel.

Births
 22 February – Lin Tsung-hsien, Magistrate of Yilan County (2009–2017)
 17 March – Lin Hsi-shan, Secretary-General of Executive Yuan (1999–2016)
 20 March – Kuo Tai-yuan, baseball player
 8 May – Fu Kun-chi, Magistrate of Hualien County (2009–2018)
 27 July – Vanessa Shih, Vice Minister of Foreign Affairs (2012–2016)
 10 October – Tou Chung-hua, actor
 28 November – Pan Wen-chung, Minister of Education (2016–2018)

Deaths
 24 February – Hu Shih, former Minister of Foreign Affairs.

References

 
Years of the 20th century in Taiwan